Khalil Sassi (born 5 September 1994) is a Tunisian football defender.

References

1994 births
Living people
Tunisian footballers
Club Africain players
AS Gabès players
EO Sidi Bouzid players
JS Kairouan players
US Tataouine players
Olympique Béja players
CA Bizertin players
Association football defenders
Tunisian Ligue Professionnelle 1 players
Liberian expatriate footballers
Expatriate footballers in Indonesia
Liberian expatriate sportspeople in Indonesia